The Women's Open International de Squash de Nantes 2017 is the women's edition of the 2017 Open International de Squash de Nantes, which is a tournament of the PSA World Tour event Challenger (prize money: $15,000).

The event took place at the naves with the Machines of the Isle in Nantes in France from 6 to 10 of September.

Fiona Moverley won her first Open International de Nantes trophy, beating Nele Gilis in the final.

Prize money and ranking points
For 2017, the prize purse was $15,000. The prize money and points breakdown is as follows:

Seeds

Draw & results

See also
Men's Open International de Squash de Nantes 2017
Open International de Squash de Nantes
2017 PSA World Tour

References

External links
PSA Open International de Squash de Nantes 2016 website
Open International de Squash de Nantes official website

2017 in French sport
PSA
Open international de squash de Nantes